A watch is a timepiece that is made to be worn on a person.

Watch may also refer to:

Vocabulary 
Watch, an English noun referring to those who engaged in watchkeeping or watchstanding
 Vigla (tagma), a Byzantine regiment often translated into English as the "guard watch" or "watch"
 Watch system, the system used for rotating crew duties at sea
 Watchman (law enforcement), law enforcement officer

Arts, entertainment, and media

Music

Albums
 Watch (Manfred Mann's Earth Band album), 1978
 Watch (Seatrain album), 1973

Songs
 "Watch" (Travis Scott song), 2018
 "Watch" (Billie Eilish song), 2017

Television
 "Watch" (Law & Order: Criminal Intent), a 2006 episode of Law & Order: Criminal Intent
 W (UK TV channel) (formerly Watch), a British TV station launched in October 2008

Other uses in arts, entertainment, and media
 Watch (film), a 2001 American documentary
 Watch (novel), also known as WWW: Watch, the 2010 second book in a trilogy by Robert J. Sawyer
 Watch, the name of the fictional pet dog in The Boxcar Children
 Leonardo Watch, a fictional character in Blood Blockade Battlefront

Computing and technology
 Watch (computer programming), a view of a variable's or an expression's value during computer program debugging
 Watch (Unix), a Unix command

Other uses
 Watch, Kentucky, U.S.
 Tropical cyclone warnings and watches, alerts issued to coastal areas threatened by severe storms
 Women and the Church

See also
 End of Watch (novel)
 End of Watch, a 2012 American film
 End of Watch Call
 The Watch (disambiguation)
 Watching (disambiguation)
 Watcher (disambiguation)
 Watch Me (disambiguation)